James Oliver Smith (born April 12, 1958) is an American former National Basketball Association (NBA) player. While playing at Ohio State University, Smith averaged 6.9 points and 5.4 rebounds per game in four seasons. He was drafted eighth pick in the third round of the 1981 NBA Draft by the San Diego Clippers. Smith was waived by the Clippers on October 27, 1982 and was then signed by the Detroit Pistons on December 28, 1982. In his NBA career, Smith averaged 2.9 points and 2.5 rebounds per game.  Smith also played in the Continental Basketball Association, splitting the 1982-83 season between the Reno Bighorns and the Wyoming Wildcatters, averaging 16.3 points and 5.2 rebounds in 78 games.

References

1958 births
Living people
American men's basketball players
Basketball players from Cleveland
Detroit Pistons players
Forwards (basketball)
Ohio State Buckeyes men's basketball players
Reno Bighorns (CBA) players
San Diego Clippers draft picks
San Diego Clippers players
Wyoming Wildcatters players